Elections to Langbaurgh Borough Council took place on 10 May 1976. The whole council was up for election under new boundary changes. The Conservative Party won the most seats and took overall control of the council.

Election result

Ward Results

Bankside

Belmont

Brotton

Church Lane

Coatham

Dormanstown

Eston

Grangetown

Guisborough

Hutton

Kirkleatham

Lockwood

Loftus

Longbeck

Newcomen

Normanby

Ormesby

Overfields

Redcar

Saltburn

Skelton

Skinningrove

South Bank

St. Germains

Teesville

West Dyke

References

1976 English local elections
1976
1970s in North Yorkshire